Giuseppe Maria Gioacchino Cambini (Montelupo Fiorentino, 8 april 1746Netherlands? 1810s? or Paris? 1825?) was an Italian composer and violinist.

Life

Unconfirmed information
Information about his life is scarcely traceable. Louis-Gabriel Michaud, French scholar and François-Joseph Fétis, Belgian musicologist, drafted his biography, and Cambini himself speaks about his past in an article published in Allgemeine musikalische Zeitung in 1804. However, all of these documents are full of errors and, therefore, need to be verified. It is not possible to confirm his personal data (only Fétis indicates his date of birth), nor his first studies. It is possible he is connected in some way to father Giovanni Battista Martini, and, more possibly to Filippo Manfredi, who was almost certainly his violin teacher. Fétis wrote about his unfortunate operatic debut in Naples in 1766, after which, during his return to Livorno by the sea, Cambini was kidnapped by pirates, who treated him terribly until his liberation by a Venetian aristocrat. The narration by the Belgian holds much resemblance to a story in the poetic periodical Correspondance littéraire, philosophique et critique, a fact that reduces its reliability.  In the article found in Allgemeine musikalische Zeitung in 1804, Cambini claims to have played the viola in a string quartet with Luigi Boccherini, Pietro Nardini and his teacher Manfredi for six months in 1767. If what he says is true, this quartet would represent the first formation of this emerging genre in Italy, if not in all of Europe. For many years, this information fostered a gigantic legend about the importance of the role of Cambini in defining the string quartet. Actually, he was one of the many (even if one of the most prolific) who, in the same period, contributed to the development of the genre.

First years in Paris
The first information that we have that is certain is his arrival in Paris at the beginning of the 1770s, where he remained for 20 years, and composed oratorios, concert compositions, as well as chamber, symphonic, and theatrical compositions (there are almost 14 operas, of which at least 12 were performed in Paris. In addition, there are some ballets that aroused the admiration of Christoph Willibald Gluck), and he performed his violin concertos (during the Concert Spirituel and the Concerts des Amateurs, managed by François-Joseph Gossec). More than 600 compositions were published with his name in the French capital until 1800 (above all by the Venier, Berault and Sieber publishers, see also the section Sources), of which more than 80 are symphonies concertante (he wrote more of these than any other French composer of the time, becoming a champion of the genre).

Polemic with Mozart
His success in composing for the sinfonia concertante genre inspired the rivalry of Wolfgang Amadeus Mozart, who in 1778 accused Cambini of having obstructed the performance of his Sinfonia Concertante for Four Winds KV 297b at the Concert Spirituel, because Cambini was jealous of its perfection. The skepticism with regard to Cambini is not observed from any other composer who dealt with him. Conversely, Gluck, in the same years, often recommended him as an upstanding and honest man. Therefore, it is probable that the Salisburg  expressed exaggerated feelings toward Cambini.

Alternating Parisian fame
The accusation by Mozart is not especially valid partially because the power of Cambini in Paris did not reach the level that Mozart claimed. In fact, the musical press paid less than gratifying attention to Cambini's vast production. He was cited relatively few times in the contemporary critiques, and his career as a violinist is less appreciated than other contemporary soloists of the time. His greatest successes, as aforementioned, were the sinfonie concertanti and his quartets, which even Mozart praised. His easy style, attractive and brilliant, open only just enough to innovation, rendered him a sort of protector of the galant Parisian style, and many of his pieces were favorably accepted in London as well as in America (some actively participated in defining the so-called forma sonata), but his theatrical works, operas, were almost always torn to shreds. Moreover, from 1785 it was affirmed in France of the more complex Viennese style, to which he tried to awkwardly join, undermining his fame, and damaging his reputation in the press of the German area.

The Revolution
In 1788, he became manager of the Théâtre Beaujolais, and he worked there during the revolutionary turmoil until 1791. His endurance permitted continuity of a high-quality operatic offering even in the years of the Republic. During the time of the Terror, beginning in 1791, he directed the Théâtre Louvois, which due to the economic crisis caused by the war was forced to close in 1794. The crisis affected many, as well as the estate of Cambini, and it constrained him to find very different work opportunities. Beginning in 1794, he accepted a salary from the chemist and entrepreneur Armand Séguin, for whom he gave private concerts and composed more than 100 quartets. He composed revolutionary and patriotic anthems for the newborn Republic. He taught violin, voice and composition privately. In addition, he transcribed opera arias of other authors for any buyer. He accepted editorial commissions (in 1795, the editor Gavreaux asked him to attend to the reprinting of methods for violin by Francesco Geminiani, and in 1799 Nademann and Lobry hired him to edit one for flute).

Oblivion
At the beginning of the 1800s, Cambini signed contracts with periodicals and magazines, including the Allgemeine musikalische Zeitung and Tablettes de Polymne, which published his articles until 1811. From that moment, Cambini disappears without leaving any trace in any documents. Michaud affirms that he died in Holland in 1818, information that satisfies scholars and has a certain amount of credibility, while Fétis recounts his painful and tragic admission to a mental hospital in Bicêtre, where he was found dead in 1825.

Sources
There proves to be more than 600 examples of works by Cambini diffused throughout the world. More than 300 consist of printed editions, 250 are in manuscript copies, and about 100 are proven autographs. We have received only his instrumental music. In fact, only the music of Le Tuteur avare, written in collaboration with Pasquale Anfossi in 1787 (today preserved at the Bibliothèque Municipale de Lille) remains of his operas. For many years, there was a symphony that was considered to be his, but in reality it is by Joseph Martin Kraus for Boyer publishers. From 1784 to 1786, the publisher released the work of the then unknown Kraus under the name of the more famous Cambini in order to sell more copies, causing the misunderstanding of attribution, which was not resolved until 1989.

Autographs
All 100 known autographs are in the United States of America, at the Library of Congress in Washington D.C. and at the New York Public Library for the Performing Arts.

Manuscripts
The largest collection of manuscripts of Cambini's compositions are found in Prague, in the music history department of the National Czech Museum of Music.  Following, in order of the number of preserved copies are: the Benediktinerstift der Bibliothek und Musikarchiv die Seitenstetten in Austria (the majority however are without a date)), the Conservatorio Benedetto Marcello di Venezia (Torrefranca and Correr Collection), and the Biblioteca di Archeologia e Storia dell'Arte di Palazzo Venezia in Rome (Vessella Collection). Smaller Italian collections are in the Pasini Collections at the Conservatorio Luca Marenzio in Brescia, at the Conservatorio Cherubini of Florence, at the Conservatorio Paganini di Genoa, at the Biblioteca Estense di Mantova, at Casa Verdi in Milan, at the Conservatorio San Pietro a Majella in Naples, and at the Biblioteca Casanatese di Roma (Marefoschi Collection and more). The Musical Documentation Center of Tuscany preserve three manuscripts of single parts of other chamber music compositions in the Venturi Music Collection in Montecatini Terme. Cities around the world that preserve at least five manuscripts are: Basel (Universitätsbibliothek), Cheb (Státní okresní archiv), Keszthely (Helikon Kastélymúzeum Könyvtára), Leutkirch im Allgäu (Fürstlich Waldburg-Zeilsches Archiv), Lille (Bibliothèque Municipale), Lund (Universitetsbiblioteket), New Haven (Music Library at Yale University), Prague (Biblioteca Nazionale Ceca), Steinfurt (Fürst zu Bentheimsche Musikaliensammlung Burgsteinfurt Collection, managed by Westfälische Wilhelms-Universität within the Universitäts- und Landesbibliothek di Münster), Stockholm (Musik- och teaterbiblioteket) and Västerås (Stadsbibliotek).

Printed editions
The Conservatoire de Paris and the Bibliothèque Nationale de France are the institutions that preserve the majority of the printed editions during Cambini's life, followed by the British Library of London, the Rossijskaja Gosudarstvennaja Biblioteka of Moscow, the Fürst zu Bentheimsche Musikaliensammlung Burgsteinfurt of Steinfurt, the Gesellschaft der Musikfreunde of Vienna, the Biblioteca Nacional of Spain, the Kongelige Bibliotek of Copenhagen, the Biblioteca Estense of Modena, and the Biblioteca Nazionale Universitaria of Turin (in the Foà and Giordano collection).

Compositions

Operas
Les romans (ballet-héroïque, libretto by L.-C.-M. de Bonneval, 1776 at the Académie Royale de Musique of Paris)
Rose et Carloman (comédie-héroïque, libretto by A.D. Dubreuil, 1779)
La statue (comédie, libretto by M.-R. de Montalembert, 1784)
La bergère de qualité (comédie, libretto by M.-R. de Montalembert, 1786)
Le tuteur avare (opéra bouffon, libretto by J.-L. Gabiot de Salins, 1788)
La croisée (comédie, 1788, Beaujolais)
Colas et Colette (opéra bouffon, 1788, Beaujolais)
Le bon père (opéra bouffon, libretto by J.-F. Le Pitre, 1788, Beaujolais)
La prêtresse du soleil (drama, 1789, Beaujolais)
La revanche, ou Les deux frères (comédie, libretto by P.U. Dubuisson, 1790, Beaujolais)
Adèle et Edwin (opéra, 1790, Beaujolais)
Nantilde et Dagobert (opéra, libretto di P.-A.-A. de Piis, 1791, Louvois)
Les trois Gascons (opéra, libretto by Cambini, 1793, Louvois)
Encore un tuteur dupé (comédie, libretto by P.-J.-A. Roussel, 1798, Montansier)

Doubted attribution
Alcméon (tragédie lyrique, libretto by A.D. Dubreuil, 1782, never performed)
Alcide (opéra, libretto by A.D. Dubreuil, 1782, never performed)
L'Amour et la peur, ou L'amant forcé d'être fidèle (opéra-comique, libretto by Cambini, 1795)

Sacred music
Le sacrifice d'Isaac (French oratorio, 1774)
Joad (French oratorio, 1775)
Samson (oratorio, libretto by Voltaire, 1779; lost)
Le sacrifice d'Abraham (oratorio, 1780; lost)
5 masses
Miserere, motet à grand choeur (1775, lost)
Some other motets

Anthems and revolutionary songs 
Hymne à l'être suprème (1794)
Hymne à l'égalité (1794)
Hymne à la Vertu (1794)
Hymne à la Liberté (1794)
Hymne à la Victoire (1794)
Ode sur Bara et Viala (1794)
Ode sur nos victoires (1794)
Ronde Républicaine (1794)
Le pas de charge républicain – Air de combat (1794)

Instrumental music

Concerto for viola and orchestra
3 symphonies for strings, 2 oboes and 2 horns, op.5 (1776)
3 symphonies à grand orchestre for strings, flute, 2 oboes, bassoon and 2 horns (1787)
3 symphonies for strings, 2 oboes and 2 horns (1788)
82 concert symphonies (of which 76 are published and 52 currently available)
110 quintets for 2 violins, viola, 2 violoncellos (maybe 114), of which 84 are complete (preserved at the Washington Library)
149 quartets for strings (1773-1809)
At least 104 trios
At least 212 duets
5 Quartets for harpsichord, violin, oboe and violoncello
6 sonatas for violino and bass
Petits airs variés for violin
12 sonatas for flute and bass
6 sonatas for harpsichord/fortepiano and violin, op.21 (1781)
Air de Marlborough avec variations for fortepiano/harpsichord and violin obbliged
6 sonate for harpsichord/fortepiano and flute
Marche des Marseillois et la Carmagnole variées for flute and bass (1794)
Variations sur le Hymne du siège de Lille (L'amour dans le coeur d'un Français) (1794) for two violins Variations sur le Hymne "Vos aimables fillettes" (1794) for two violins Variations sur Cadet Roussel (1794) for two violins
Petits airs connus variés for flute and bass
Air variés for flute, op.6
Différens solfèges d'une difficulté graduelle (1783)

Articles
Nouvelle méthode théorique et pratique pour le violon (c. 1795)
Méthode pour la flûte traversière suivie de vingt petits airs connus et six duo à l'usage des commençans (1799)
Ausführung der Instrumentalquartetten, «Allgemeine musikalische Zeitung» (1803-1804)
2 articles in «Correspondance des professeurs et amateurs de musique» (1804)
Über den Charakter, den die italienischen und deutschen Musik haben, und die französische haben sollte, «Allgemeine musikalische Zeitung» (1804-1805)
6 articles in Les tablettes de Polymnie (1810-1811)

Recordings
Around 1936, the Quartet of Rome (Francesco Montelli and Oscar Zuccarini, violins; Aldo Perini, viola; Luigi Silva, violoncello), recorded Quartetto in Re maggiore by Cambini adapted by Fausto Torrefranca. The 78 rpm disc of the first publication are preserved at the Istituto centrale per i beni sonori e audiovisivi di Roma, and are digitalized on Internet Culturale.

References

Further reading
Jean-Benjamin de Laborde, Essai sur la musique ancienne et moderne, 4 voll., Paris, Pierres, 1780, digitalized in Gallica.
Antoine-Jean-Baptiste-Abraham d'Origny, Annales du Théâtre Italien, depuis son origine jusqu'a ce jour, Paris, Duchesne, 1788, digitalized in Gallica.
Giuseppe Cambini [Cambiui in Paris], Ausführung der Instrumentalquartetten, in «Allgemeine musikalische Zeitung», VI/47 (22 August 1804), Leipzig, Breitkopf & Härtel, 1804, columns 781-783 (digitalized in Internet Archive and Google Books).
Giuseppe Cambini [C. de Paris], Über den Charakter, den die italienischen und deutschen Musik haben, und die französische haben sollte, in «Allgemeine musikalische Zeitung», VII/10 (5 December 1804), Leipzig, Breitkopf & Härtel, 1804-1805, pp. 149–155, digitalized in Internet Archive.
Louis Picquot, Notice sur la vie et les ouvrages de Luigi Boccherini, suivie du catalogue raisonné de toutes ses œuvres, tant publiées qu'inédites, Paris, Philipp, 1851, digitalized in Internet Archive.
Louis-Gabriel Michaud, Biographie Universelle ancienne et moderne, second edition, vol. 6, Paris, Desplaces, 1854, pp. 457–458, digitalized on Internet Archive.
François-Joseph Fétis, Biographie universelle des musiciens et bibliographie générale de la musique, second edition, vol. 2, Paris, Didot, 1861, pp. 162–164, digitalized on  Google Books.
Antoine Vidal, Les instruments à archet: les feseurs, les joueurs d'instrument, leur histoire dur le continent européen, suivi d'un Catalogue général de la musique de chambre, vol. 3, Paris, Claye et Quantine, 1878, p. 59, digitalized on Internet Archive.
Constant Pierre, Les hymnes et chansons de la Révolution. Aperçu général et catalogue, Paris, Imprimerie Nationale, 1904, digitalized on Gallica.
Jacques-Gabriel Prod'homme (ed.), Lettres de Gluck et à propos de Gluck (1776-1787), in «Zeitschrift der Internationale Musikgesellschaft», 13 (1911–12), Leipzig, Breitkopf & Härtel, 1912, p. 257.
Arnaldo Bonaventura, Musicisti livornesi, Livorno, Belforte, 1930.
Gino Roncaglia, Di Giovanni Giuseppe Cambini. Quartettista Padre, in «La rassegna musicale», VI/5 (September 1933), Torino, Fedetto, 1933, pp. 267–274.
Gino Roncaglia, Appunti di storia musicale. Ancora di Giovanni Giuseppe Cambini, in «La rassegna musicale», VII/2 (March 1934), Torino, Fedetto, 1934, pp. 131–133.
Gino Roncaglia, G. G. Cambini quartettista romantico, in «La rassegna musicale», VII/6 (November 1934), Torino, Fedetto, 1934, pp. 423–432.
Clarence D. Brenner, A bibliographical list of plays in the French language, 1700-1789, Berkeley, University of California Press, 1947. Reprint: New York, AMS, 1979.
Alfredo Bonaccorsi, Di alcuni Quintetti di G.G. Cambini, in «La rassegna musicale», XX/1 (January 1950), Torino, Fedetto, 1950, pp. 32–36.
Barry S. Brook, The «Symphonie Concertante»: An Interim Report, in «The Musical Quartertly», XLVII/4 (October 1961), New York, Oxford University Press, 1961, pp. 493–516.
Clarence D. Brenner, The Théâtre Italien: Its Repertory, 1716–1793, Berkeley, University of California Press, 1961.
Gino Roncaglia, Giovanni Giuseppe Cambini quartettista, in Adelmo Damerini e Gino Roncaglia (ed.), Musiche italiane rare e vive da Giovanni Gabrieli a Giuseppe Verdi. Per la XIX settimana musicale, 22-30 luglio 1962, Siena, Ticci, 1962, pp. 183–194.
Fausto Torrefranca, Avviamento allo studio del quartetto italiano, in «L'approdo musicale», 23 (1966), edited by Alfredo Bonaccorsi, Roma, ERI, 1966, pp. 15–181.
Dieter Lutz Trimpert, Die Quatuors concertants von Giuseppe Cambini, Tutzing (Baviera), Schneider, 1967.
Guglielmo Barblan, Giovanni Maria Cambini e i suoi scritti sulla musica, in Memorie e contributi alla musica dal medioevo all’età moderna offerti a Federico Ghisi nel settantesimo compleanno (1901-1971), Bologna, Antiquae Musicae Italicae Studiosi, 1971, pp. 295–310.
Raoul Meloncelli, Cambini, Giuseppe Maria (Giovanni Giuseppe, Giangiuseppe), in Dizionario biografico degli italiani, vol. 17, Roma, Istituto dell'Enciclopedia Italiana, 1974, available on-line in Italian on Treccani.it.
Constant Pierre, Histoire du «Concert Spirituel» 1725-1790, Paris, Heugel, 1975.
Karen Moeck, The Beginning of Woodwind Quintet, in «NACWPI Journal», XXVI/2 (November 1977), Washington, National Association of College Wind and Percussion Instructors (NACWPI), 1977, pp. 22–33.
Guido Salvetti, Cambini, Giuseppe Maria Gioacchino, in Dizionario enciclopedico della musica e dei musicisti, edited by Alberto Basso, serie II: Le biografia, vol. 2: BUS-FOX, Torino, UTET, 1985, pp. 80–81.
Robert Levin, Mozarts Bläserkonzertante KV Ahn. 9/297B und ihre Rekonstruktionen im 19. und 20. Jahrhundert, in «Mozart-Jahrbuch des Zentralinstitutes für Mozartforschung der Internationalen Stiftung Mozarteum Salzburg» (1984/1985), Kassel (ecc.), Bärenreiter, 1986, pp. 187–207.
Gabriella Biagi-Ravenni, Manfredi, Filippo, in Dizionario enciclopedico universale delle musica e dei musicisti, edited by Alberto Basso, serie II: Le biografie, vol. 5: JE-MA, Torino, UTET, 1986, p. 608.
Robert Levin, Who Wrote the Mozart Four-Wind Concertante?, Stuyvesant (NY), Pendragon, 1988.
Guido Salvetti, Nardini, Pietro, in Dizionario enciclopedico universale delle musica e dei musicisti, edited by Alberto Basso, serie II: Le biografie, vol. 4: ME-PIA, Torino, UTET, 1988, p. 326.
Michel Noiray, Les créations d’opéra à Paris de 1790 à 1794, in Jean-Rémy Julien e Jean-Claude Klein (ed.), Orphée phrygien. Les Musiques de la Révolution, Paris, Editions du May, 1989, pp. 193–203.
Cesare Fertonani, Gli ultimi quartetti di Giuseppe Maria Cambini, in Francesco Degrada e Ludwig Finscher (ed.), Luigi Boccherini e la musica strumentale dei maestri italiani in Europa tra Sette e Ottocento. Atti del convegno internazionale di studi, Siena, 29-31 luglio 1993, in «Chigiana», new series XLIII/23 (1993), Firenze, Olschki, 1993, pp. 247–279.
Jean Gribenski, Cambini, Giuseppe Maria (Gioacchino), in Die Musik in Geschichte und Gegenwart. Allgemeine Enzyklopädie der Musik begründet von Friedrich Blume, edited by Ludwig Finscher, serie I: Personenteil, vol. 4: Cam-Cou, Kassel-Basel-London-New York-Praha, Bärenreiter/Stuttgart-Weimar, Metzler, 2000, columns 9-17.
Chappell White, Jean Gribenski, Amzie D. Parcell, Cambini, Giuseppe Maria (Gioacchino), in The New Grove of Music and Musicians. Second Edition, edited by Stanley Sadie, executive editor John Tyrrell, vol. 4: Borowski to Canobbio, London, Macmillan, 2001-2002, pp. 858–861.
Gianni Lazzari, Il flauto traverso. Storia, tecnica, acustica, with Il flauto del Novecento by Emilio Galante, Torino, EDT, 2003, pp. 109, 125, 127-128, 131.
Daniel Heartz, Music in European Capitals: The Galant Style (1720-1780), New York, Norton, 2003.
Martin Staehelin, Ist die sogenannte Mozartsche Bläserkonzertante KV 297b/Anh. I,9 echt?, Berlin-Boston, De Gruyter, 2013, pp. 3–6.

External links

 G. M. Cambini from Tesori Musicali Toscani
Musical Documentation Center of Tuscany

1746 births
19th-century deaths
People from Livorno
Italian classical composers
Italian male classical composers
Italian violinists
Male violinists
Italian opera composers
Male opera composers
Year of death uncertain
String quartet composers